Jaime Mendez may refer to:

 Jaime Mendez (American football) (born 1971), Puerto Rican collegiate football free safety
 Jaime Hernández Méndez (born 1933), Guatemalan politician and brigadier General
 Jaime Prieto Mendez (born 1950s), Colombian human rights activist
 Jaime Valle Méndez, Mexican professor of engineering